Aimee Mann is an American singer-songwriter who has released several albums since the early 1980s. Originally, she worked in collaboration with The Young Snakes and 'Til Tuesday, before becoming a solo artist. In 2013, she and Ted Leo began performing as a duo called The Both.

Albums

Studio albums

Live albums 

 Live at St. Ann's Warehouse (2004)

Compilation albums 

 Ultimate Collection (2000)

Soundtrack albums

Singles

As lead artist

Collaborations 
 1987 – "The Faraway Nearby" by Cyndi Lauper (backing vocals) on her album True Colors
 1987 – "Time Stand Still" by Rush (backing vocals) on the album Hold Your Fire
 1990 – "Yesterday (You Stopped Crying)" covered by Sarah Brightman on her album "As I Came of Age"
 1993 – "Under Jets" by Murray Attaway (backing vocals) on his album In Thrall
 2004 – "Static on the Radio" with Jim White on his album Drill a Hole in That Substrate and Tell Me What You See
 2004 – "That's Me Trying" by William Shatner (backing vocals) on his album Has Been
 2005 – "Where's the Party?" by Jim Boggia (backing vocals) on his album Safe in Sound
 2005 – "How Am I Different" by Bettye LaVette on her album I've Got My Own Hell to Raise
 2006 – "Ms. Ketchup and the Arsonist" by The Honeydogs (backing vocals) on the album Amygdala
 2008 – "My Father's Gun" by Elton John. Aimee has been playing this cover at every show throughout her 2008 Smilers tour.
 2008 – "Hearts" by Tim & Eric (lead vocals) on their album Awesome Record, Great Songs! Volume One
 2012 – "No More Amsterdam" with Steve Vai on his album The Story of Light
 2012 – "Bigger Than Love" with Ben Gibbard on his album Former Lives
 2012 - "All The Times We Had" with Ivan & Alyosha on their album All the Times We Had
 2017 – "No Love" with Scott Miller (co-written, duet) on the Game Theory album Supercalifragile
 2021 – "Name of the Game" by Susanna Hoffs on her album Bright Lights

Soundtrack appearances 
 1996 – Jerry Maguire ("Wise Up")
 1998 – Sliding Doors ("Amateur")
 1999 – Cruel Intentions ("You Could Make a Killing")
 2003 – Buffy the Vampire Slayer: Radio Sunnydale - Music from the TV Series ("Pavlov's Bell")
 2007 – Arctic Tale ("At the Edge of the World", with Zach Gill and "The Great Beyond")
 2019 – Steven Universe the Movie (Original Soundtrack) (Vocals: "Independent Together", writing: "Drift Away")
 2021 – M.O.D.O.K. (Original Soundtrack) ("Never Let You Go")

Compilation appearances 
 1995 – "One", a Harry Nilsson cover for the For the Love of Harry: Everybody Sings Nilsson tribute album. Later appears on the Magnolia soundtrack and in the 2001 film, Just Can't Get Enough
 1996 – "Christmastime" with Michael Penn, plays over the credits for the film, Hard Eight
 1996 – "Christmastime" with Michael Penn, appears on the holiday compilation album Just Say Noël
 1996 – "Baby Blue", a Badfinger cover, appears on the tribute compilation Come and Get It: A Tribute to Badfinger
 1997 – "Nobody Does It Better", a cover of the Carly Simon theme for The Spy Who Loved Me on the compilation, Shaken and Stirred: The David Arnold James Bond Project
 1999 – "The Christmas Song", a cover of the Mel Tormé/Robert Wells song popularized by Nat King Cole, appears on the holiday compilation Viva Noel: Q Division Christmas
 2000 – "Reason to Believe" with Michael Penn, a Bruce Springsteen cover on the album Badlands: A Tribute to Bruce Springsteen's Nebraska
 2001 – "I Just Wasn't Made for These Times" with Michael Penn, duet during A Tribute To Brian Wilson
 2002 – "Two of Us" and "Lucy in the Sky with Diamonds", Beatles covers for the I Am Sam soundtrack. The former also includes Michael Penn, and the latter was only released on the European edition of the album.
 2004 – "What the World Needs Now", a Burt Bacharach cover. First appeared in a Calvin Klein commercial, and was later available on the Starbucks compilation album Sweetheart 2005: Love Songs
 2005 – "Dear John" appears on the compilation album Acoustic 05 (The Echo Label)
 2007 – "Save Me" appears on the compilation album Acoustic 07 (V2 Records)
 2007 – "White Christmas" appears on the Starbucks holiday compilation album Stockings By the Fire
 2008 – "Freeway" appears on the live, studio compilation album KGSR Broadcasts – Volume 16
 2014 – "I'm Cured" for the charity comedy album 2776
 2019 – "Hold On", a Tom Waits cover on the album Come On Up to the House: Women Sing Waits

Videography

References

Discography
Discographies of American artists
Rock music discographies
Pop music discographies